is a former Japanese football player, currently working as head coach.

A former player at hometown club Albirex Niigata, Okuyama coached youth teams of Albirex after his playing career ended, and also coached the Albirex Niigata Ladies for four years. He was appointed at Albirex's satellite team in Singapore from 2014, succeeding Koichi Sugiyama. Okuyama was Sugiyama's assistant during the 2013 season.

References

External links
Goal.com profile

1976 births
Living people
Japanese footballers
Albirex Niigata players
People from Niigata Prefecture
Singapore Premier League head coaches
Association football defenders
Albirex Niigata Singapore FC managers
Japanese football managers